Shilpi is a 1994 Bengali film. The film was directed by Nabyendu Chatterjee. The film was produced by National Film Development Corporation of India.

Plot 
A man, who works at the house of Roy Bahadur, falls in love with his daughter. However, Roy Bahadur wants his daughter to marry his friend's son.

Cast 
 Anjan Dutt 
 Asit Bandopadhyay
 Meghnad Bhattacharya 
 Rita Dutta Chakraborty
 Srilekha Mukhopadhyay

Awards 
 1995 Bengal Film Journalists' Association Awards Best actor: Anjan Dutt

See also 
 Akaler Sandhane

References

External links 
 

1994 films
Bengali-language Indian films
1990s Bengali-language films
Films directed by Nabyendu Chatterjee